The 1927 NFL season was the eighth regular season of the National Football League. Prior to the season, the league decided to eliminate the financially weaker teams. As a result, the league dropped from 22 to 12 teams. The league absorbed many players and one franchise (the New York Yankees) from the defunct American Football League. Wilfrid Smith in the Chicago Tribune wrote that "the reduction formed a more compact circuit and provided better competition." Smith opined that the "outstanding feature" of the 1927 NFL season was the debut of Benny Friedman who became one of the game's "best drawing cards" and proved that professional football could support itself in Cleveland.

Although five black players participated in the 1926 season (including future Hall of Famer Fritz Pollard), none played during the 1927 season.

The New York Yankees were added from the American Football League (albeit technically as a continuation of the defunct Brooklyn franchise), the Cleveland Bulldogs returned, and the Buffalo Rangers returned to the Buffalo Bisons name. The Bisons suspended operations five games into the season (all losses). The Rochester Jeffersons remained officially inactive for the second consecutive year.

The axed teams were the Kansas City Cowboys, Los Angeles Buccaneers, Detroit Panthers, Hartford Blues, Brooklyn Lions, Canton Bulldogs, Milwaukee Badgers, Akron Indians, Racine Tornadoes, Columbus Tigers, Hammond Pros, and Louisville Colonels. The excising of the majority of the Ohio teams left the Dayton Triangles as the last surviving connection to the Ohio League, which served as the basis for the NFL's founding. The Triangles themselves are the only remaining Ohio League member that can arguably be considered a team that remains active to the present day, as the franchise, in some form, never missed a season and now operates as the Indianapolis Colts, just 117 miles to the west of their origin.

The New York Giants were named the NFL champions after finishing the season with the best record. The Giants performance was notable, particularly on defense. They allowed only 20 points in 13 games, including 10 shutout victories.

Teams
The league dropped from 22 teams in 1926 to 12 teams in 1927.

Major rule changes
The goal posts were moved to the end line.

Championship race
After seven weeks, the Chicago Bears were unbeaten at 5–0–1, followed by the once-beaten New York Giants (6–1–1) and Green Bay Packers (5–1–1).  Two games played in New York City on Tuesday, November 8, changed the standings.  The New York Yankees handed the Bears a 26–6 defeat, while the Giants beat Providence, 25–0.  At 7–1–1, the Giants were in first place, while the Bears and Packers were tied for second (5–1–1).  On November 20, the Bears beat the visiting Packers, 14–6, and, at 7–1–1, were within striking distance of the 8–1–1 Giants.  Thanksgiving Day, however, saw the Bears lose at Wrigley Field to their crosstown rivals, the Chicago Cardinals.

With three games left, the most important game of the regular season took place on November 27, at the Polo Grounds, where 15,000 turned out to watch the Bears (7–2–1) face the Giants (8–1–1).  A Bears' win would have tied the teams for first place, but the Giants won, 13–7.  The New York Giants and New York Yankees closed their seasons with a two-game series.  At home at the Polo Grounds, the Giants beat the Yankees 14–0 to clinch the title on December 4, and then beat them again at the old Yankee Stadium on December 11, to finish at 11–1–1.

Standings

References

 NFL Record and Fact Book
 NFL History 1921–1930 (Last accessed December 4, 2005)
 Total Football: The Official Encyclopedia of the National Football League

1927